Leland Hotel, also known as the Leland Motor Inn, is a historic hotel building located at Richmond, Wayne County, Indiana.  It was built in 1928, and is a seven-story, "U"-shaped, Mission Revival style reinforced concrete building sheathed in light brown brick dwelling. The building was modernized in the mid-1960s and removed or covered many of the original details. It is the tallest building in Richmond.

It was listed on the National Register of Historic Places in 1985.

References

Hotel buildings on the National Register of Historic Places in Indiana
Mission Revival architecture in Indiana
Hotel buildings completed in 1928
Buildings and structures in Richmond, Indiana
National Register of Historic Places in Wayne County, Indiana